Balakudru Shrimatha is the Gurupeetha for the brahmins of South Canara District mainly Shivalli sects who follow  Advaitha philosophy. This Peetha is now running upon the directions of Jagadguru of Shringeri Shaaradha Peetha. The ashram is headed now by Shri Shri Narasimhashrama Swamiji.

Location
Balakudru Shrimatha is situated at the confluence of Sita and Swarna rivers. The main deity is God Narasimha. This place is near Hangarakatte Village in Udupi district of Karnataka state.

History
"Balakudru Sreematha" follows the Bhagavatha Sampradaya according to Advaitha which is well established all around India by Shri Adi Shankaracharya, the uplifter of Sanatana Dharma. This is the only Advaitha Peeta in entire Dakshina Kannada and Udupi districts. This Shri Matha has more than thousands of years of history and is stated to be founded by Kaivalyashrama Swamy. This is the ‘Sannidhi’ of Lord Lakshminarasimha, Goddess Sharadamba, Sangameshwara, Heramba Ganapathi, and Varadaanjaneya. This is situated in a place by name ‘Hangaarakatte’ located in between the National Highway of Udupi-Kundapur which is near the confluence of ‘Sita’ and ‘Swarna’ rivers. The beautiful idol of the God Shri Lakshminarasimha is stated to be brought from Badari Kshetra by Kaivalyashrama Swamy. There are several branches of this Matha in Karnataka and also a branch in Gujarat.

The fact that when the Shreematha is established is unknown. As per the tradition of Shreematha, it is believed that Sage Kaivalyashrama who belongs to the tradition of Kumārila Bhaṭṭa (one who believed as the disciple of Gaudapada, who was the Guru of Shankaracharya ) established it. Kaivalyashrama traveled towards South India after visiting all the holy pilgrims in North India. After visiting Shankaranarayana kshetra, he enters a city called Soura in the beds of the river Shuktimati. Samantha, the king of the Soura region got influenced by the sage and donated his land for running ashrama there. Later the sage travels to Jalapura (Today's Neelavara), worships Ambika, makes all the arrangements for Nitya-pooja over there with the help of localities. Then through Brahmavara he enters the land of Balakudru and establishes this Shrimatha over there. Kaivalyashrama's Vrindavana is believed as exists in a lake called Mayagundi near Udupi which is considered as Aadi-Vrindavana of Shrimatha.

References

 Antiquities of South Kanara  (1969), Prabhakara Press.P. Gururaja Bhatt, Antiquities of South Kanara, Prabhakara Press, 1969, 31 pages.
Saletore, B.A., Ancient Karnataka History of Tuluva, vol. I, 1936.

External links
 An article in the collection of Shreematha, written by historian P. Gururaja Bhat 
 
 Shivalli Smartha Brahmins
 Shri Nrasimhashrama Swamiji takes over as seer of Balekudru Math
 Shri Nrasimhashrama Swamiji participated in the Jayanthi Mahotsavam & Amritotsavam at Kanchi - Ati Rudra & Sahasrachandi Mahayaga from 30 May to 9 June 2010 at Kanchi Kamakoti Peetam
 Nrasimashrama Swamiji participated in Vishwagou Sammelana organized by Shri Raghaveshwara Bharathi Swamiji of Ramachandrapura Matha
 Nrasimashrama Swamiji participating in Anti Cow slaughter movement with  Shri Shri Viswesha Theertha Swamiji of Pejavara Matha
https://archive.org/details/Tulunadu_201602
https://archive.org/details/AHistoryOfSouthKanara
https://archive.org/details/218431AncientKarnatakaHistoryOfTuluvaVolI

Hindu temples in Udupi district
Tulu Brahmins
Hindu monasteries in India